Ángel Pérez (born February 2, 1971 in Havana) is a Cuban-born American Sprint Kayaker who competed from the early 1990s to the mid-2000s.

In 1991, he was a Pan American Games 5 Gold Medalist and 1 Silver Medalist in Sprint Kayak in Havana, Cuba. At the 1992 Summer Olympics in Barcelona, Spain, for Cuba, he was a Semifinalist of both the K-1 500 m and the K-2 1000 m events.

In 1993 he and two other Cuban athletes sneaked away from an altitude training center in Mexico City, and sought asylum in Miami. In 1996, while already a resident of the US and being a qualified Olympic US Canoe and Kayak Team member, he was not able to participate in the 1996 Atlanta Olympic Games because he was not yet a US Citizen.  Four years later in the Olympic Games in Sydney, Australia, for the United States, US Citizen Pérez finished sixth in both the K-2 500 m and the K-4 1000 m events. Angel Perez was able to compete in Sydney, Australia despite a legal battle in the Olympic Court of Arbitrations, as Cuba fought in International Courts not to allow his former athlete to compete for the USA. A few hours before the start of the Sydney Games, Perez was legally allowed to compete. In 2004 he retired to pursue other careers.  Angel Perez, a Certified General Contractor, currently resides with his wife, Mari, and two children, Andres Roberto (b. 1996) and Marcos Alejandro (b. 2009)in Miami, Florida.

References

Sports-Reference.com profile

1971 births
Sportspeople from Havana
American male canoeists
Canoeists at the 1992 Summer Olympics
Canoeists at the 2000 Summer Olympics
Cuban male canoeists
Living people
Olympic canoeists of Cuba
Olympic canoeists of the United States
Defecting sportspeople of Cuba
Cuban emigrants to the United States
Pan American Games medalists in canoeing
Pan American Games gold medalists for Cuba
Pan American Games silver medalists for Cuba
Canoeists at the 1991 Pan American Games
Medalists at the 1991 Pan American Games